The Calabasas Civic Center serves the city of Calabasas, located in the western San Fernando Valley, Los Angeles County, California, United States.

Complex
The civic center complex includes the Calabasas City Hall, Calabasas Library, Calabasas Amphitheater, and landscaped−furnished public patios. 

The Spanish Colonial Revival style complex, which opened in July 2008, is located just west of The Commons at Calabasas shopping center.

References

External links
 City of Calabasas Civic Center website — with photographs.
 Ramsa.com: Photos of the Calabasas Civic Center

Calabasas, California
Buildings and structures in Los Angeles County, California
Buildings and structures in the San Fernando Valley
Government buildings completed in 2008
2008 establishments in California
2000s architecture in the United States
Spanish Colonial Revival architecture in California